Holburn is a hamlet in the English county of Northumberland. Holburn is located between Lowick and Belford.

Governance 
Holburn is in the parliamentary constituency of Berwick-upon-Tweed.

See also 
Holburn Lake and Moss

References

External links

Villages in Northumberland